Eugenia Railean (born 27 November 2004) is a Moldovan footballer who plays as a defender for Women's Championship club ȘS 11-Real Succes Chișinău and the Moldova women's national team.

See also
List of Moldova women's international footballers

References

2004 births
Living people
Moldovan women's footballers
Women's association football defenders
Moldova women's international footballers